The Chūshi Powerline Crossing is a part of the , a 220 kV powerline in Japan. It has two circuits running over the Inland Sea from Takehara. These towers are the tallest electricity pylons in Japan and carry six conductors arranged in three levels. The span between the two towers has a length of 2,357 metres and has a minimum clearance of 42 metres. The conductors have a cross section of 170 mm2, a diameter 35.2 mm and are designed for a maximum current of 645 A.

See also 
 Osaki Channel Crossing

External links 
 https://web.archive.org/web/20090224150653/http://www015.upp.so-net.ne.jp/overhead-TML/historicalline.htm

Towers in Japan
Electric power infrastructure in Japan